Scott Borchert is an American writer.

Life 
He graduated from New York University. He was  assistant editor at Farrar, Straus and Giroux. His work appeared in the Atlantic. and Air.mail.

Works 

 Republic of Detours: How the New Deal Paid Broke Writers to Rediscover America, Farrar, Straus and Giroux, 2021. ISBN 9780374298456

References

External links 

 
Scott Borchert — Republic of Detours: How the New Deal Paid Broke Writers to Rediscover America - Roosevelt House Public Policy Institute at Hunter College, June 17, 2021
Republic of Detours | C-SPAN.org

Living people
21st-century American male writers
Year of birth missing (living people)
Place of birth missing (living people)
New York University alumni